Sandra Maaike Jayne Verschoor (born 25 April 1959) is an Australian businesswoman who was the Lord Mayor of Adelaide in South Australia from 12 November 2018 until November 2022. Prior to this, she was Deputy Lord Mayor and a General Manager at the City of Adelaide.

Early life and education
Verschoor is the second daughter of Dutch immigrants to Australia and grew up in Elizabeth. She has a Master of Arts, an MBA and a PhD in Business Administration from Kennedy Western University.

Career
Verschoor worked in broadcasting and marketing in the early 1990s, and became marketing manager of the Adelaide Festival of the Arts in 1995 and Marketing & Development Director 1996-1999. As the Associate Director of Arts Projects Australia 2001 - 2006 she worked on WOMADelaide and helped establish the Adelaide Film Festival. She was CEO of the Adelaide Fringe from 2006 to 2010. In 2011, she became the executive producer of the Festival of Ideas.

In 2012, Verschoor worked as general manager for the Adelaide City Council for three years  before being elected to council at a by-election in 2015.

She took up the role of Executive Producer of the Windmill Theatre in 2015 and CEO of the Adelaide Festival in 2016.

From June 2017 to November 2018, she served as Deputy Lord Mayor for 18 months.

After Martin Haese decided not to run in the 2018 election, he endorsed Verschoor.  Verschoor was elected Lord Mayor in November 2018, defeating lawyer Mark Hamilton and bookshop owner Kate Treloar. She served for four years, before being defeated in the November 2022 election by former politician and lord mayor Jane Lomax-Smith.

Personal life
Verschoor is married and has two daughters and a son.

References

Living people
Mayors and Lord Mayors of Adelaide
South Australian local councillors
Women mayors of places in South Australia
Australian Institute of Business alumni
1959 births
Women local councillors in Australia
Deputy mayors of places in Australia